is a former rural district located in Gunma Prefecture, Japan. All of the city of Annaka and a tall portion of the city of Takasaki were formerly part of the district.

History
Per a census conducted at the end of the Edo period,  the area of Usui district contained 33 villages under the control of Annaka Domain, nine villages under Takasaki Domain, four villages under Yoshii Domain and 29 villages administered as tenryō directly by the Tokugawa shogunate. 
Usui District was established on December 7, 1878, and with the establishment of the municipality system on April 1, 1889 the area was organized into five towns (Annaka, Haraichi,  Sakamoto, Matsuida and Itahana) and 13 villages
 

1890, March 1 – Usui village was raised to town status
1936, July 1 – Isobe village was raised to town status
1954, May 3 – Usui and Sakamoto towns and Nishiyokono, Sukumo, and Hosono villages were merged into Matsuida.
1955, January 20 – Toyooka and Yawata villages are annexed by the city of Takasaki
1955, February 1 – Satomi village merges with Murota village in Gunma District to form the town of Haruna; Ubuchi village merges with Kurata village in Gunma District to form Kurabuchi village
1955, March 1 – Annaka town annexes the towns of Haraichi, Isobe, and Itahana, and villages of Higashiyokono, Iwanoya, Akima and Gokan
1958, November 1 – Annaka was raised to city status
2006, March 16 – Matsuida town was annexed by Annaka city, dissolving Usui District.

Former districts of Gunma Prefecture